Kishore Dilip Shinde  is an Indian professional kabaddi player. She was member of the India national kabaddi team that won Asian gold medals in 2014 in Incheon.

She has been awarded with Maharashtra state award Shiv Chatrapati Award for the year 2014-2015. It is the highest sporting honour for any sports player in Maharashtra

She has also represented in first ever women's kabaddi league Women's Kabaddi Challenge by Pro Kabaddi in the year 2016. In this tournament she was part of team Fire Birds which was led by Kabaddi star Mamatha Poojary (captain of the team). The Fire Birds lost in finals against the Storm Queens led by Tejaswini Bai.

Kishori Shinde was No 1 defender of the tournament by 15 Successful Tackle points.

References

Living people
Indian kabaddi players
Asian Games medalists in kabaddi
Kabaddi players at the 2014 Asian Games
Year of birth missing (living people)
Asian Games gold medalists for India
Medalists at the 2014 Asian Games